JJCC (pronounced J-J-C-C; Hangul: 제이제이씨씨) is a five-member South Korean hip hop boy band formed under the management of Jackie Chan Group Korea. The group debuted on March 20, 2014, with five members: E.co, Eddy, SimBa, San-Cheong and Prince Mak who performed live on MNet M Countdown. Their debut single entitled At First was then released on March 24.
JJCC is the first K-pop idol group to be formed by Jackie Chan.

Etymology
The name of the band is composed of the man who forms the group and the group's aim. The first "JC" comes from the first letters of the words Jackie and Chan while the second "JC" comes from the first letters of the words join and cultures. When combined, it is literally "Jackie Chan Joint Cultures" (JJCC) translated to "Jackie Chan, let's spread K-Pop". In the same way, the pronunciation of the group name (Double-JC) stands for "Double Joy Creative" or "Let's create double the joy". The band name is a tribute to Chan as well as his effort to "join cultures" in Asia through music.

History

Formation of the group
Jackie Chan is a long-time fan of K-Pop. After seeing Kpop's great potential and development, he started to form a Kpop group and even personally manages them. JJCC's aim is for the world to be conquered once Asian culture unites through their different music and charm. In preparation for this, the members of JJCC received individual training on their personality and stunts as well as improving their singing, dancing, rapping, songwriting, and acting skills. Their dance skills include popping, b-boying, and even ballet. They are also able to speak in three languages- English, Chinese, and Korean.

Together with Chan, veteran K-Pop producer-composer Choi Jun-Young is serving as the executive producer of the group while Sha-Sha Lee is the CEO of the newly formed Jackie Chan Group South Korea establishment.

Pre-debut
The group is composed of five Koreans (E.Co, Yul, Zica, SimBa, San-Cheong), one Korean American (Eddy) and one inactive Chinese Australian (Prince Mak). Eddy competed on the cooking challenge show "Master Chef Korea" once, and is known for his cooking skills. Members SimBa and Eco are also models.

Although K-Pop is still rare on the Western mainstream, the group already attracted the American media prior to their debut mainly because of Jackie Chan. They were included in major news outlets such as the New York Post and even appeared in traditional papers. Jackie Chan's presence gave JJCC a possibility for the Korean wave to enter the American mainstream.

2014-2016: Debut & first years
On March 13, 2014, JJCC released their first teaser which was posted on their YouTube account, "Double JC". During this time, little is still known about the group except the revelation of the members and Jackie Chan as the producer-manager. One week after, on March 20, 2014, JJCC was first seen live on  Mnet's M! Countdown, performing "At First" ("Everyone Is Like This At First"), which was also their official debut date. It was followed by Music Bank and Inkigayo. Finally on March 24, JJCC released their debut single as well as its music video. The song combines a melancholy hip-hop beat and a bit of R&B track. Prince Mak is not included in the music video as it is reported that he injured himself before the filming.
Together with Kim Hee Sun and EXO, JJCC are performing on Chan's charity event entitled "2014 Peace, Love and Friendship" on April 6 in Beijing. The event, organized by Jaycee Chan, will have celebrities from all over the world and will include a concert, a fan meeting, launching event for ‘Jackie Chan Film Hall’ in Shanghai and more. The youngest member of the group (Maknae) San-Cheong played a small role in the Korean drama " Madame Antoine " which aired in January 2016.

2017: Rumours surrounding Prince Mak's departure
Before the group began their Japanese promotions, there was a lot of confusion over Prince Mak's status amongst them. With JJCC's Japanese company and official Facebook page updating JJCC's bio to state that JJCC had six members, many assumed he had left the group. However, Prince Mak personally stated that he is still a member of JJCC, but is currently working on solo activities, although sources such as JJCC's official websites have stated otherwise. Since then Prince has signed to Emperor Entertainment Group Beijing for his acting activities, and JJCC has continued as a sextet.

2017: Prince Mak's Departure
On the SBS PopAsia radio show 'The Prince Mak Hour', Prince Mak answered a fan's question about his status within JJCC. He stated that while he is not signed to JJCC's Korean agency, he still considers himself to be a JJCC member.

JJCC's USA Tour
JJCC went on tour in the US from August 6–12, 2017.

Produce 101
San-Cheong and Yul participated in Produce 101 Season 2. Both members were eliminated in episode 5.

Mix Nine
Simba, Yul, Eddy and Zica participated in JTBC's survival show Mix Nine audition. And only Simba passed the audition, being placed 56th among the male contestants. However Simba was eliminated in episode 7 ranking 118th.

Members

Current
Simba (심바) – Rapper (2014–present)
Eddy (에디) – Vocalist (2014–present)
Yul (율) – Vocalist (2015–present)
Zica (지카) – Vocalist, rapper (2015–present)
San Cheong (산청) – Vocalist, rapper (2014–present)

Former
Prince Mak (프린스 맥) – Vocalist (2014–2017)
E.Co (이코) – Vocalist, rapper (2014–2020)

Discography

Extended plays

Singles

Tour
JJCC Live Tour In America (2017)

References

External links

 

Musical groups established in 2014
South Korean dance music groups
K-pop music groups
South Korean boy bands
Chinese musical groups
Musical groups from Seoul
2014 establishments in South Korea
Jackie Chan